Sarı Qəmiş (also known as Sārī Qamish) is a village in Kandovan Rural District, Kandovan District, Meyaneh County, East Azerbaijan Province, Iran. At the 2006 census, its population was 413, in 87 families.

References 

Populated places in Meyaneh County